MV Algonorth was a Seawaymax lake freighter built in 1970 and completed in 1971 by the Govan Division of Upper Clyde Shipbuilders Ltd. in Govan, Scotland as the bulk carrier Temple Bar. Her original owners were Lambert Bros. Shipping Ltd., of London, United Kingdom, sold the vessel in 1976 to Nipigon Transport Ltd., who had her hull lengthened and installed a new power plant for Great Lakes service. Re-entering service as Lake Nipigon, the ship was renamed Laketon in 1984 before returning to the name Lake Nipigon in 1986. In 1987, the lake freighter was sold to Algoma Central Railway which gave the ship its final named, Algonorth.  In 2007, the ship collided with a dock in Toledo, Ohio. The ship was scrapped in 2012.

Description
In 1974, the bulk carrier was re-engined with two Werkspoor 9TM410 9-cylinder engines creating .

Service history
The ship was constructed by the Govan Division of Upper Clyde Shipbuilders Ltd. at their yard in Govan, Scotland, for Lambert Bros. Shipping Ltd., of London, United Kingdom. The vessel was laid down on 22 December 1969 with the yard number 101 and was launched on 1 September 1970. Named Temple Bar, the bulk carrier was completed on 8 April 1971 and registered in London. In 1974, Temple Bar underwent a refit at Rotterdam, Netherlands where the new engines were installed. In 1976, the ship sailed to Singapore to undergo refit and lengthening for service on the Great Lakes after being purchased by Nipigon Transport Ltd. The ship returned to service with a Canadian registry and renamed Lake Nipigon in May 1977.

While in service on the Great Lakes, the lake freighter serviced ports along the St. Lawrence Seaway and in the Great Lakes on both the Canadian and American sides of the border. The vessel transported a multitude of cargoes including grains such as barley, corn, wheat, oats and rye along with coal. On 24 May 1983, Lake Nipigon went aground off Port Colborne, Ontario, due to a power failure. After being freed, the ship sailed to Montreal, Quebec, for repairs. In 1984, the lake freighter was chartered to Misener Transportation and renamed Laketon in their service. When the charter ended, the ship's name reverted to Lake Nipigon.

In April 1986, Lake Nipigon was acquired by Algoma Central Railway, renamed Algonorth and registered in Sault Ste. Marie. On 14 November 1992, while departing Toledo, Ohio, Algonorth lost control while being assisted by tugboats and its bow collided with drawbridge supports while the stern struck the cargo ship Murray Bay which was loading at the dock. Neither vessel suffered serious damage in the incident and Algonorth was freed the following day. On 2 August 1994, Algonorth struck the cargo ship Rixta Oldendorff near the Beauharnois Canal in the St. Lawrence Seaway, with both vessels suffering minor damage. The following year on 30 July, Algonorth struck the barge Medusa Conquest. Neither vessel suffered serious damage. 

On 20 December 1999, the ship ran aground in the harbour at Sarnia, Ontario, after loading a cargo of grain. Algonorth was freed with no damage. The ship suffered a small fire on 21 February 2005 while in winter layup at Toronto, Ontario, resulting in no damage to ship and small loss of cargo. Algonorth suffered a second fire that year on 16 August while transiting from Hamilton, Ontario, to Thunder Bay, Ontario that caused the ship to lose power. The fire was extinguished and the lake freighter completed the journey with the assistance of tugboats, undergoing repairs upon arrival.

The Maumee River was closed to traffic. Algonorth was scrapped beginning on 18 July 2012.

Citations

References

 
 
 

Merchant ships of Canada
1970 ships
Ships built in Govan
Algoma Central Marine